Dongara is a town  north-northwest of Perth, Western Australia on the Brand Highway. The town is located at the mouth of the Irwin River. 

Dongara is the seat of the Shire of Irwin. At the  the shire had a population of 3,569, with 2,782 residing in the contiguous towns of Dongara and Port Denison.

History

The place name 'Dongara' is an anglicised rendition of Thung-arra, the local Wattandee people's name for the estuary adjacent to the town, meaning 'sea lion place'.

European settlement around the estuary began in 1853 when a harbourmaster, Edward Downes, was stationed there to look out for passing ships.  He was employed by Lockier Burges, Edward Hamersley, Samuel Pole Phillips and Bartholomew Urban Vigors' Cattle Company, which was granted 60,000 acres of pastoral leases about 15 kilometres inland. By the 1860s, ex-convict small farmers were occupying the local river flats, and a flour mill (the Irwin or Smith's Mill) was operating.  A townsite was surveyed, and in 1871 it became the seat of a local council established that year (now the Irwin Shire Council), and site of a police station and public school.  The Anglican Church of St John the Baptist and a Methodist Church were built in the 1880s.

In the 1890s, the larger Royal Steam Roller Flour Mill was built on the flats next to the new Midland Railway line that connected the district to Perth. The town slowly developed, and although still a comparatively small village by the time of Federation in 1901, it had several churches, municipal offices and hall, a variety of shops, two hotels, a public school and a railway station. The nearby localities were populated by wheat and sheep farmers, centred on the hamlets of Bookara, Irwin and Strawberry. There was also a small population of fishermen, including several Chinese men, at Port Denison.

Dongara is the centre for a small oil and natural gas industry that began with the discovery of the Dongara Gas Field in 1966.

Notable people from or associated with Dongara
 Sir David Brand (1912–1979), 19th Premier of Western Australia, born at Dongara
 Robert Bruning (1928–2008), born Robert Bell, PMG linesman, sales manager, actor, film producer, screenwriter, script editor
 Carmen Lawrence (1948- ), 25th Premier of Western Australia
 Cranston Albury McEachern (1905–1983), Australian army officer and solicitor

References

External links

 Shire of Irwin
 Dongara Information

Coastal towns in Western Australia
Shire of Irwin
Fishing communities in Australia